The glow-throated hummingbird (Selasphorus ardens) is an Endangered species of hummingbird in tribe Mellisugini of subfamily Trochilinae, the "bee hummingbirds". It is endemic to a small area of Panama.

Taxonomy and systematics

The glow-throated hummingbird is monotypic.

Description

Both sexes have a short, straight, black bill. The adult male has bronzy green upperparts and the tail feathers are black with rufous edges. Its gorget is pinkish red with a white foreneck below it. The center of the breast and belly are also white and the rest of the underparts buffy to cinnamon with green spangles and buffy white undertail coverts. Adult females are also bronzy green above. Their central tail feathers are green; the rest have rufous bases, a black band near the end, and deep buffy tips. The throat is pale buff with grayish speckles and the rest of the underparts are like the male's. Immature birds resemble adult females but have rusty fringes on their head and nape feathers and more green on the tail.

Distribution and habitat

The glow-throated hummingbird is found only in west-central Panama's Chiriquí and Veruagas provinces. It was historically found more widely in Serranía de Tabasará but since the early 20th century is known only from Cerro Colorado and Cerro Flores in Chiriquí and Cerro Tute and the Santa Fé district in Veraguas. There are unsatisfactory sight records from the Azuero Peninsula, where its presence is considered hypothetical.

Behavior

Movement

The movements of the glow-throated hummingbird, if any, are unknown.

Feeding

Nothing is known about the foraging behavior or diet of the glow-throated hummingbird. Both are assumed to be similar to that of its close relative, the scintillant hummingbird (S. scintilla). That species, like most hummingbirds, feeds on nectar from flowers and on small insects.

Breeding

Nothing is known about the glow-throated hummingbird's breeding phenology.

Vocalization

As of July 2022 neither the Cornell Lab of Ornithology's Macaulay Library nor xeno-canto have any recordings of the glow-throated hummingbird's vocalizations.

Status

The IUCN originally assessed the glow-throated hummingbird in 1988 as Threatened, then in 1994 reassessed it as Vulnerable and in 2013 as Endangered. It has a very restricted range that has shrunk since the 19th century. Its population is estimated at between 2000 and 12,000 mature individuals and is believed to be decreasing. Though it is found in Santa Fé National Park, outside the park and even within it its forest habitat is fragmented and under continued clearing for agriculture and grazing. It also lives near the top of the rather low mountains and so is expected to undergo further range contraction as the climate continues to warm.

References

glow-throated hummingbird
Endemic birds of Panama
Birds of the Talamancan montane forests
Hummingbird species of Central America
glow-throated hummingbird
glow-throated hummingbird
Taxonomy articles created by Polbot